Great Oakley is a village and civil parish in the Tendring district of Essex, England. It is a long, narrow parish lying on the top of a low (25 m) ridge south of Ramsey Creek which drains northeast towards Harwich. The parish extends south to Oakley Creek, a branch of Hamford Water, where stood Great Oakley Dock, now disused.

The church, dedicated to All Saints, contains some Norman work. The living thereof is in the gift of St John's College, Cambridge.

The village is served by All Saints Great Oakley C of E Primary School.

A public house called The Three Cups – after the emblem of the Salters Company – used to be situated in the village, indicating that there were salt works in the area. The parish still contains a large chemical works (the Great Oakley Works), operated by EPC-UK, which produces the cetane improver 2-ethyl hexyl nitrate, and also provides specialist explosives handling services.

The Village now has only one public house, called The Maybush Inn, which in 2016 was reopened as a Community Pub.

The Village has a men's football team Great Oakley FC which plays in the Colchester and District Sunday League.

Governance
Great Oakley is part of the electoral ward called Great and Little Oakley. The ward population at the 2011 census was 2,188.

Nearby places

Notable people
James Cockle, a surgeon and father of mathematician and first Chief Justice of Queensland Sir James Cockle.

References

External links

 Entry in Kelly's Directory of Essex, 1894
 Great Oakley Parish Council Website Great Oakley Parish Council Website]
 All Saints Church website
 The Maybush Inn Website

Villages in Essex
Civil parishes in Essex
Tendring